Buhoodle District is a district in the Togdheer region of Somalialand. Its district capital is Buuhoodle.

Demographics 
The district is inhabited by the Dhulbahante clan of the Daarood clan-family with many lineages residing there. Lineages that include, The Farah Garad: Ahmed Garad and Barkad, who are well represented. the Baho Nugaaled: Khalid, Yahya, Hayaag, Mohamed Muse and the Abokor Muse. The Mohamoud Garad: mainly the Reer Khayr and Reer Warsame sections of the Jama Siad.

See also
Administrative divisions of Somaliland
Regions of Somaliland
Districts of Somaliland
Somalia–Somaliland border

References

External links
 Districts of Somalia
 Administrative map of Buhoodle District

Districts of Somaliland
Togdheer
Disputed territory between Somaliland and Puntland